The Alameda County Study is a longitudinal study of residents from Alameda County, California, which examines the relationship between lifestyle and health. The "1965 cohort" were given health questionnaires in 1965, 1973, 1985, 1988, 1994, and 1999. The researchers found that those who followed five practices lived healthier and longer lives:

 Avoiding smoking.
 Exercising regularly.
 Maintaining a healthy body weight.
 Sleeping seven to eight hours per night. (For related research, see Sleep#Optimal.)
 Limiting consumption of alcoholic drinks.

Another study of the Alameda cohort suggests that social and community ties can also help an individual to live longer.

Later studies of the cohort considered the impact of religiosity, social status, and hearing loss on health outcomes.

See also 
 Blue Zone
 
 Religiosity
 Self care

References 

1965 establishments in California
Alameda County, California
Epidemiological study projects
Cohort studies